Sycamore Creek, a tributary stream of the Rio Grande, with its source in Edwards County, ten miles east of Carta Valley in southwest Edwards County,  .  It flows southwestward to Val Verde County then southward to the Val Verde / Kinney County line along which it flows past its confluence with Mud Creek and Sacatosa Creek to the Rio Grande.

See also
List of rivers of Texas

References

Tributaries of the Rio Grande
Rivers of Kinney County, Texas
Rivers of Val Verde County, Texas
Bodies of water of Edwards County, Texas
Rivers of Texas